The Rivers State Ministry of Health is a ministry of the Government of Rivers State that facilitates the provision of health services to residents and visitors in Rivers State, Nigeria. Its current headquarters is at 2nd Floor, State Secretariat Complex, Port Harcourt.

Leadership
The Commissioner is in charge of overseeing the daily activities of the Ministry. The Permanent Secretary supports the general policies and priorities of the government which operates within the context of the management practices and procedures created for the government as a whole. The Permanent Secretary also sees that major projects, policy formulation and direction, sectoral strategies and development plan for the Ministry are implemented.

Organizational structure

Departments
Administration
Finance & Account
Planning, Research & Statistics
Pharmaceutical Services
Medical Services
Public Health Services
Nursing Services

Parastatals
Rivers State Hospital Management Board
Institutions
College of Health Science and Technology
School of Nursing
School Of Midwifery
Rivers State Primary Health Care Management Board

List of commissioners

Emi Membere-Otaji (1999–2003)
Solomon Enyinda 
Silas Eneyo
Tamunoiyoriari Sampson Parker
Odagme Theophilus (2015–2017)
Princewill A. Chike (2017–present)

See also
Government of Rivers State

References

External links
Official website

Health
Rivers State
Health in Rivers State